Isabelle Söderberg (born 28 May 1989) is a Swedish professional racing cyclist. She competed at the 2012 Summer Olympics in the Women's road race.

See also
 2012 AA Drink-leontien.nl season

References 

1989 births
Living people
Olympic cyclists of Sweden
Swedish female cyclists
Cyclists at the 2012 Summer Olympics
Sportspeople from Uppsala